4175 Billbaum, provisional designation , is a background asteroid from the central regions of the asteroid belt, approximately  in diameter. It was discovered on 15 April 1985, by American astronomer Edward Bowell at the Anderson Mesa Station of the Lowell Observatory near Flagstaff, Arizona. The uncommon L-type asteroid has a short rotation period of 2.73 hours and was named for American astronomer William A. Baum.

Orbit and classification 

Billbaum is a non-family asteroid of the main belt's background population when applying the hierarchical clustering method to its proper orbital elements. Based on osculating Keplerian orbital elements, the asteroid has also been classified as a member of the Eunomia family, a prominent family of stony S-type asteroid and the largest one in the intermediate main belt with more than 5,000 members.

It orbits the Sun in the central main-belt at a distance of 2.2–3.2 AU once every 4 years and 5 months (1,606 days; semi-major axis of 2.68 AU). Its orbit has an eccentricity of 0.19 and an inclination of 14° with respect to the ecliptic. The body's observation arc begins with a precovery taken at Palomar Observatory in August 1951, almost 34 years prior to its official discovery observation at Anderson Mesa.

Physical characteristics 

Billbaum has been characterized as an uncommon L-type asteroid by Pan-STARRS survey.

Rotation period 

In January and February 2011, three rotational lightcurves of Billbaum were obtained from photometric observations by Ralph Megna, Josep Aymami and astronomers at the Oakley Southern Sky Observatory. Analysis of the best-rated lightcurve gave a short rotation period of 2.73 hours and a consolidated brightness amplitude between 0.08 and 0.15 magnitude.

Diameter and albedo 

According to the survey carried out by the NEOWISE mission of NASA's Wide-field Infrared Survey Explorer, Billbaum measures 8.87 kilometers in diameter and its surface has an albedo of 0.27, while the Collaborative Asteroid Lightcurve Link assumes a stony standard albedo of 0.21, derived from 15 Eunomia, the Eunomia family's parent body – and calculates a diameter of 9.60 kilometers based on an absolute magnitude of 12.4.

Naming 

This minor planet was named after American astronomer William A. Baum (1924–2012) who was on the directorship of the Lowell Observatory's Planetary Research Center. He also worked on the Hubble Space Telescope. The official naming citation was published by the Minor Planet Center on 28 April 1991.

Notes

References

External links 
 William A. Baum (1924–2012), American Astronomical Society
 Ralph Megna, homepage (archive)
 Asteroid Lightcurve Database (LCDB), query form (info )
 Dictionary of Minor Planet Names, Google books
 Asteroids and comets rotation curves, CdR – Observatoire de Genève, Raoul Behrend
 Discovery Circumstances: Numbered Minor Planets (1)-(5000) – Minor Planet Center
 
 

004175
Discoveries by Edward L. G. Bowell
Named minor planets
19850415